The 1956 Miami Redskins football team was an American football team that represented Miami University in the Mid-American Conference (MAC) during the 1956 NCAA University Division football season. In its first season under head coach John Pont, Miami compiled a 7–1-1 record (4–0–1 against MAC opponents), finished in second place in the MAC, held five of nine opponents to seven points or less, and outscored all opponents by a combined total of 159 to 83.

Mack Yoho was the team captain.  The team's statistical leaders included Dave Thelen with 635 rushing yards, Tom Dimitroff with 349 passing yards, and Charles Brockmeyer with 60 receiving yards.

Schedule

References

Miami
Miami RedHawks football seasons
Miami Redskins football